Sunset House is an unincorporated community in northern Alberta within the Municipal District of Greenview No. 16.

References 

Localities in the Municipal District of Greenview No. 16